The Zaporizhzhia Regional Committee of the Communist Party of Ukraine, commonly referred to as the Zaporizhzhia CPU obkom, was the position of highest authority in the Zaporizhzhia Oblast, in the Ukrainian SSR of the Soviet Union. The position was created on January 10, 1939, and abolished in August 1991. The First Secretary was a de facto appointed position usually by the Politburo or the First Secretary of the Communist Party of Ukraine.

List of First Secretaries of the Communist Party of Zaporizhzhia

See also
Governor of Zaporizhzhia Oblast

Notes

Sources
 World Statesmen.org

Regional Committees of the Communist Party of Ukraine (Soviet Union)
Ukrainian Soviet Socialist Republic
History of Zaporizhzhia Oblast
1939 establishments in the Soviet Union
1991 disestablishments in the Soviet Union